Three-time defending champions Peter Fleming and John McEnroe successfully defended their title, defeating Kevin Curren and Steve Denton in the final, 6–3, 6–3 to win the doubles tennis title at the 1981 Masters Grand Prix.

Knockout stage

Draw

References
New York Times Archive 17 January 1982, 18 January 1982 as reported by Neil Amdur

Doubles